Chakat Aboh is an All India Trinamool Congress politician. She was elected as a member of Arunachal Pradesh Legislative Assembly from Khonsa West on 24 October 2019. She obtained 5,705 votes against 3,818 votes for her opponent, Azet Homtok. On 1 January 2021 she joined All India Trinamool Congress.

She is the wife of NPP leader Tirong Aboh.

References

Independent politicians in India
Living people
Arunachal Pradesh MLAs 2019–2024
Year of birth missing (living people)
Women members of the Arunachal Pradesh Legislative Assembly
Trinamool Congress politicians from Arunachal Pradesh
21st-century Indian women politicians